James Higginson Weekes (September 11, 1911 – June 13, 1977) was an American sailor and Olympic champion.

He competed at the 1948 Summer Olympics in London, where he won a gold medal in the 6 metre class with the boat Uanoria, together with Herman Whiton, James Smith, Alfred Loomis and Michael Mooney.  He graduated from Harvard University.

References

External links

1911 births
1977 deaths
American male sailors (sport)
Sailors at the 1948 Summer Olympics – 6 Metre
Olympic gold medalists for the United States in sailing
Medalists at the 1948 Summer Olympics
Harvard University alumni